Archips bulbosus is a moth of the family Tortricidae. It is found in Vietnam.

The wingspan is 23 mm. The forewings are almost unicolourous ochreous rust, but paler postmedially, suffused and weakly strigulated (finely streaked) with rust colour in the basal half. The hindwings are orange, but brownish in the anal half.

Etymology
The name refers to shape of the antrum.

References

Moths described in 2009
Archips
Moths of Asia
Taxa named by Józef Razowski